Dmitry Timofeyevich Kozlov (October 23 (November 4) 1896, Razgulyayka, now in Nizhny Novgorod Oblast – December 6, 1967, Minsk) was a Soviet military commander.

Life

1914–1941
Born in the village of Razgulyayka, he left school in 1915 and joined the Russian Army at the rank of Praporshchik. He served in the First World War and graduated from officer training school in 1917. He moved to the Red Army in 1918, commanding a battalion then a regiment in the Russian Civil War. 

In December 1922 he became the commander of the 4th Turkestan Regiment, then of the 109th Regiment in September 1924. He moved to the staff in 1928, then to head the Kiev Infantry School in 1930. He then became the commander and commissar of 44th Rifle Division in January 1931. Next he became a general tactical lecturer at the RKKA Military Academy in December 1935, deputy commander of the troops in Odessa Military District in April 1940, head of the Main Directorate of Red Army Air Defence in December 1940. 1940 also saw him promoted to lieutenant general. He also fought in the Russo-Finnish War.

1941–1967
In January 1941 he was appointed commander of the troops of Transcaucasian Military District and when the Germans invaded in August that year he was put in command of the Transcaucasian Front, where he led the Soviet contingent in the Anglo-Soviet invasion of Iran. 

He moved to command the Caucasian Front in December 1941 and the Crimean Front in January 1942. He commanded the Kerch Peninsula landings but, despite initial successes, the operation ended in disaster, with the Soviets losing over 176,000 men, 37 tanks, around 3,500 guns and mortars and 400 aircraft and losing the bridgehead to the Germans in Operation Trappenjagd. On 4 June 1942 he was demoted to major general and removed from command of the front. In August that year he was transferred to command 24th Army and from October 1942 was assistant deputy commander of the Voronezh Front.

Kozlov headed Kharkov's defence and was one of the last Russians to leave it before the Germans recaptured it on 14 March 1943. From 14 to 21 March 1943 Soviet divisions were constantly withdrawing through the woods northeast of Mokhnachev, and Kozlov took the same route away from Kharkov. From May to August 1943 he was given a post on the Leningrad Front and from August 1943 was made deputy commander of the Transbaikal Front, where he took part in the Soviet offensives against Japan. From 1946 until his retirement in 1954 he was made deputy commander of Transbaikal. He died in 1967 in Minsk.

Sources
 KA Zaleski, Империя Сталина. Биографический энциклопедический словарь. (Stalin's empire. Biographical Encyclopaedia.) Moscow, Veche, 2000.

1896 births
1967 deaths
People from Semyonov, Nizhny Novgorod Oblast
People from Nizhny Novgorod Governorate
Soviet lieutenant generals
Frunze Military Academy alumni
Military personnel of the Russian Empire
Russian military personnel of World War I
Soviet military personnel of the Russian Civil War
Soviet military personnel of the Winter War
Soviet military personnel of World War II
Recipients of the Order of Lenin
Recipients of the Order of the Red Banner